Enteromyxum is a genus of myxozoans.

Species
The World Register of Marine Species includes the following species in the genus:
 Enteromyxum fugu (Tun, Yokoyama, Ogawa & Wakayabashi, 2002)
 Enteromyxum leei (Diamant, Lom & Dyková, 1994)
 Enteromyxum scophthalmi Palenzuela, Redondo & Alvarez-Pellitero, 2002

References

Myxidiidae
Cnidarian genera